Muslim Aid is a UK based Islamic International Non-Governmental Organization (INGO). The international humanitarian charity has relief and development programmes in countries across Africa, Asia, and Europe. It is the second oldest Muslim charity in the UK and celebrated its 35th anniversary in 2020. The charity works to support and empower people suffering the effects of poverty, war, and natural disaster through both emergency relief and sustainable programmes designed to provide long-term support and independent futures to the most vulnerable communities around the world. The charity is a long standing member of a number of umbrella organisations including BOND, NCVO and is one of the founding members of the Muslim Charities Forum. Traditionally supported by its local communities, it has established partnerships with major institutional funders around the world including the UN World Food Programme (WFP), The UN Refugee Agency, DFID, European Commission (ECHO) and others. It is the UK's second oldest Muslim charity.

History and beginnings
It was first established in 1985, in response to the 1983–85 famine in Ethiopia, by 23 organisations based in Britain. It was initially led by a committee including Cat Stevens and members from the Muslim Council of Britain. Stevens served as chairman until his resignation in 1996. Suhaib Hasan became the next chairman. Mahmood al-Hassan became executive director in 1993. From 1995, Iqbal Sacranie was a trustee. The following year, conflicts in Afghanistan and Palestine and floods in Bangladesh saw Muslim Aid expand its emergency relief operations. Over the past 25 years Muslim Aid has grown from a small office in London to an international UK NGO, providing relief and development programmes in over 70 countries across the globe.

By 1989 Muslim Aid's operations had expanded considerably and over £1 million of emergency aid had been distributed throughout Africa, Asia and Europe. As the charity grew, the scope of its work expanded. Muslim aid is a matrix organisational structure.

Whilst continuing to carry on its commitment to emergency relief work Muslim Aid also began to implement long-term development programmes. Today, water, healthcare, shelter and construction programs.

Muslim Aid believes that in order to really help people, the causes, not just the symptoms of poverty must be addressed. By 1994 long-term development projects accounted for almost 50% of Muslim Aid's relief activity. As well as helping people overcome crisis' Muslim Aid provides skills and resources to assist people to move forward to a better life. Muslim Aid works closely with the communities to deliver its programmes and remains committed to working in collaboration with all its beneficiaries to ensure that the solutions are not imposed from the outside. All solutions are culturally sensitive, practical and owned by the beneficiaries.

In April 2013, three men were convicted of planning terrorist attacks in UK. They raised funds by criminally posing as Muslim Aid workers; the matter was pursued by the police and prosecutions were made.  A small amount of funds was recovered and passed onto the charity.

Countries of operation
They have field offices and partners in over 13 countries including; Bangladesh, Bosnia, Iraq, Jordan, Lebanon, Pakistan, Somalia, Sri Lanka, Sudan and Myanmar. Muslim Aid has also registered and has functioning offices in Sweden and the USA. The Head Office is based in Whitechapel, London (UK). The Muslim Aid aid delivery footprint extends over 70 countries and is one of the largest of any INGO.

Over the years, Muslim Aid has developed a "world-wide network" of international partners—both corporations and humanitarian organisations—including British retail chain ASDA, the Islamic Bank of Britain, the Qatar-based Al Asmakh Charity, and the US-based United Methodist Committee on Relief. In 2014, Muslim Aid was part of an international, interfaith coalition of aid organisations that traveled to the Central African Republic to assess and raise awareness of the growing humanitarian crisis' in that country.

From its inception in 1985, Muslim Aid has grown from a small organisation to one of largest Muslim NGOs in the world. Originally working to alleviate suffering during the humanitarian crises which plagued Africa through emergency relief, Muslim Aid expanded its work to encompass long-term humanitarian assistance through economic empowerment, education, child sponsorship, water and sanitation, shelter and disaster risk reduction.

Recent work
Muslim Aid has carried out its work in many areas of the world. It operated in Indonesia following the 2004 Indian Ocean earthquake (tsunami) and then the two earthquakes in Java (one in May 2006 and the other in July of that year). It also worked in Bosnia following the Yugoslav wars of the 1990s. It worked in Pakistan following the 2005 Kashmir earthquake, to build seismically resistant sustainable housing in conjunction with UK architectural charity Article 25. It has continuously worked in the Palestinian territories, Darfur, Eritrea, Afghanistan, Lebanon and Bangladesh. It also worked in China following the 2008 Sichuan earthquake.

In 2010 Muslim Aid responded to the destructive earthquake in Haiti and the devastating floods in Pakistan. It raised nearly £600,000 and £3 million respectively to help those who afflicted by the disasters. It is continuing its reconstruction work in these countries ensuring long-term prosperity of those living there.

Since 2011, Muslim Aid has worked inside Syria, as well as in neighbouring countries through its field offices and partners, to deliver essential aid to those affected by the conflict in Syria. To date, food items, clothing, hygiene kits, medical aid and non-food items have been distributed. Education projects and long-term support of a hospital inside Syria commenced in 2016.

In 2016, Muslim Aid, in partnership with WFP, was the first NGO to reach Shirqat, Iraq, for over two years with essential food aid.

East London Mosque and Muslim Aid donated 10 tonnes of food to homeless people in December 2016.

Faith groups including Muslim Aid worked together to care for street sleepers and other vulnerable people in the run-up to Christmas in 2016 across the English capital of London are expanding their efforts by providing meals and shelter packs to rough sleepers. Their aim is to make sure those most in need are protected from cold weather and hunger during the holidays when many shops and services are closed or operating at reduced capacity.

Following the Grenfell Tower fire in 2017, Muslim Aid, in association with Islamic Relief mobilised to provide aid, collecting over 60 tonnes of supplies and raising more than £73,000 for the affected residents.

Kashif Shabir was appointed chief executive in 2021, Kashif initially joined Muslim Aid as Director of Transformation and Strategy to work on the charity’s future direction. Having been asked to step in as interim CEO, in April 2020, he has guided Muslim Aid through not only the difficulties of operating throughout the pandemic but also has implemented significant organisational change since. He brings to his new role a range of experiences from across the Muslim and non-Muslim charitable sector, having worked previously at Oxfam, British Red Cross and Mercy Mission amongst other organisations.

25th anniversary
In 2010 Muslim Aid celebrated 25 years since it began its work. The year was marked with events and initiatives to highlight its achievements and plot its future course.

In a message the Prince of Wales said:

"I have followed your progress with close interest and attention over the last quarter of a century and have admired the projects and programmes you have undertaken in more than 70 countries around the world, ranging from emergency and disaster relief to education, health and micro-finance projects. If I may say so, our country is incredibly fortunate to be able to count on organisations like Muslim Aid who bring not only help, but hope to those most in need."

Prime Minister Gordon Brown said:

"For a quarter of a century the valuable work Muslim Aid has been doing means that millions of people across the world are today safer and healthier. I wish Muslim Aid and its passionate and committed staff and supporters the very best for another 25 years of achievement."

Controversies
Controversy surrounding Muslim Aid has centered mainly on allegations of its role in the financing of terrorist or extremist organizations. In 2002, a Spanish police report alleged the organisation to have used funds to send mujahadeen fighters to Bosnia. In 2010, the organisation was investigated by the Charity Commission for England and Wales for allegedly funding groups linked to a banned terrorist organisation. The investigation cleared the organisation and said that the claims were unsubstantiated. The Sunday Telegraph criticised the outcome saying the Commission cleared the organization, "without examining any of the evidence presented," though the organisation has admitted funding two organisations linked to Hamas and the Palestinian Islamic Jihad, and alleging that Muslim Aid is "closely linked to the extremist Islamic Forum of Europe, which wants to create a sharia state in Europe."

In 2003, ABC News established a link between a Muslim Aid Australia and the Dewan Dakwah Islamiyah Indonesia (DDII) which is linked to the Islamist group Jemaah Islamiyah. In 2008, their offices in Lakemba were raided by the police over allegations that funds were being sent through Interpal to help get money into Gaza during Israeli border closures.

In 2008, the organisation was banned in Israel, due to its alleged ties to the Union of Good. A 2009 report by the US-based think-tank Nine Eleven Finding Answers Foundation, also alleged the charity was part of the Union of Good. Anthony Cordesman of the Center for Strategic and International Studies also said they funded Hamas.

In 2009, despite being dogged by allegations of foreign intelligence links and terrorist support throughout the Muslim world, Muslim Aid Pakistan, with full support of Muslim Aid UK figures appointed a former director of the Inter-Services Intelligence (ISI), Khaled Latif Mughal as its country chairman. Mughal was responsible for the Afghan and Kashmir areas of Pakistan's primary intelligence agency during the 1990s. After the Mumbai terrorist attacks of 2008, Mughal claimed the terrorist acts were a conspiracy by the United States, Israel and India to cripple Pakistan and steal its nuclear arsenal.

On 2 May 2013, an international arrest warrant was issued for its long time trustee Chowdhury Mueen-Uddin for war crimes. He was subsequently found guilty in absentia of murdering 18 Bangladesh intellectuals as a leader within Al-Badr, a pro-Pakistan Islamist paramilitary force in the Bangladesh liberation war.

The government of Bangladesh investigated the organisation for allegedly funding militants in the country. In December 2013, Mozammel Hossain, the head of the Rangpur branch of Muslim Aid, was arrested for financing "subversive activities". In April 2014, Bangladeshi politician Sayed Ashraful Islam of the Awami League Central Working Committee warned funds from the organisation were being used to spread "religious fanaticism". Again in September 2014, Major general Abdur Rashid said they funded extremism.

In 2014, the Charity Commission for England and Wales announced it was part of a "statutory inquiry". According to the charity, the investigation was caused after they reported "non-compliance with some operational aspects in two field offices". The Statutory Inquiry report has not yet been published.

In 2017, the government of Bangladesh barred the organisation from aiding the Rohingya people in Cox's Bazar, alleging funds were used to preach Islam, construct mosques, encourage radicalism, and fund militants.

Responses to controversy 
In response to the allegations made against Muslim Aid, the Charity Commission,  examined alleged ties with terrorist groups, as well as alleged payments made to groups linked with Hamas. Its investigations lasted six months (from March to September 2010), and "found no evidence of irregular or improper use of the charity's funds or any evidence that the charity had illegally funded any proscribed or designated entities". The report further concluded that the Charity Commission report "has given a public assurance that public allegations of links between [Muslim Aid] and terrorism are unsubstantiated".

In 2016, Jehangir Malik, who has previously held the top role at Islamic Relief, was appointed chief executive of Muslim Aid. He had been at Islamic Relief for 23 years, starting as a volunteer and working up to national fundraising director, before spending his last six years at the charity as its UK director. Michael King, the interim manager of Muslim Aid, said: "This is an important international NGO, rooted in the faith of the Muslim Community and carrying out work in over 70 countries across the world. My principal task is to ensure that it will be a beacon of good governance in line with good practice, so enabling it to expand its vital relief work throughout the world".

Awards and nominations
In 2013, Muslim Aid won International Charity award at the Charity Times Awards. The Charity was also nominated for the Charity of the Year award.

In January 2014, Muslim Aid was nominated for the Charity of the Year award at the British Muslim Awards.

References

External links

Muslim Aid Australia
Muslim Aid Australia Constitution
Good Company on Charity reviews
Charity Commission page on Muslim Aid
The Rainbow Family, a Muslim Aid project

1985 establishments in the United Kingdom
Organizations established in 1985
Development charities based in the United Kingdom
Islamic charities based in the United Kingdom
Islamic relief organizations
International charities